Ventral nucleus may refer to:

 Ventral lateral nucleus, a nucleus of the thalamus. It receives neuronal inputs from the basal nuclei which includes the substantia nigra
 Ventral reticular nucleus, a continuation of the parvocellular nucleus in the brainstem
 Ventral posteromedial nucleus, a nucleus of the thalamus
 Ventral posterolateral nucleus, a nucleus of the thalamus
 Ventral anterior nucleus, a nucleus of the thalamus
 Ventral posterior nucleus, a somato-sensory relay nucleus in thalamus of the brain